Agni-P or Agni-Prime (Agnī "Fire") is a medium-range ballistic missile being developed by Defence Research and Development Organisation (DRDO) as a successor for Agni-I and Agni-II missiles in the operational service of Strategic Forces Command with significant upgrades in the form of composite motor casing, maneuverable reentry vehicle (MaRV) along with improved propellants, navigation and guidance systems.

Agni-P is a two-stage, road mobile and solid-fueled MRBM which is transported by a truck and launched via a canister.It is a ballistic missile with dual redundant navigation and guidance system. It is the sixth missile in the Agni (missile) series of ballistic missile.

History and development

Beginning in 2016, various media organisations have reported that DRDO is developing a successor of Agni-I called Agni-1P with two stages that borrowed the newer technologies from Agni-IV and Agni-V to increase accuracy and reliability. India started working on area denial weapons after China developed DF-21D and DF-26B with nuclear capability to counter US Navy which brought Naval Base Guam within its reach. As a counterbalance, the progress of Agni-P became crucial part of India's Indo-Pacific strategy to tackle China's plan of having five or six aircraft carrier battle groups by 2035 to cover both Pacific Ocean and Indian Ocean with access to future overseas logistical bases around the region such as the one it currently has in Djibouti. Chinese military expert accepts that there is a capability enhancement demand in India as far as Anti Access/Area Denial (A2/AD) is concerned. Agni-P test also increases the chance of India to be part of the Intermediate-Range Nuclear Forces Treaty.

The Agni-P missile with maneuverable reentry vehicle (MaRV) capability that delivered the warheads into two separate locations. The missile is stored in a hermetically sealed tandem twin canister launcher and transported through road and rail. It uses cold launch mechanism and can be fired in salvo mode. As per V. K. Saraswat, MIRV and MaRV technology were already on advance stages of development for Agni-VI in 2013.

The MaRV carries four delta fins for the terminal phase of the flight to avoid missile defense system. It is a new class of missile in Agni Series which is half the weight of Agni-III. Both first and second stage of Agni-P are made up of composite material for the purpose of weight reduction, which was mastered during Agni-V project. The missile carries an improved guidance package and propulsion system covering maximum distance of 2000 km with 1.5 ton payload.

According to analysts, Agni-P is primarily aimed at countering Pakistan's forces owing to the fact that its range is insufficient to reach all parts of mainland China.

Although there were many speculations that Agni-P will replace Prithvi-I, Agni-I and Agni-II after induction, government sources denied any such theory. It is expected that DRDO might develop a "carrier killer" based on this missile.

One of the objectives behind its development is to achieve maximum manoeuvrability against missile defense system and higher accuracy for precision strike.

More about Agni P 

 Agni Prime is also known as Agni-P.
 Agni-P is new generation advanced variant of the Agni Class of Missiles
 It is a two-stage canisterized missile
 Its range capability is between 1000 and 2000 km
 It is the first 'declared' MIRV missile in India's missile arsenal. 
 The weight of Agni P is 50% less than Agni-III
 Agni-Prime can be launched from rail and road and can be stored for a longer period.
 It can be transported all across the country as per operational requirements.
 It can be used to target enemy vessels in the Indo- Pacific Ocean.

Testing

First Test 
On 28 June 2021, DRDO successfully test fired Agni-P (earlier known as Agni-1P) from Abdul Kalam Island which carried two multiple independently targetable reentry vehicle (MIRV) that delivered the warheads into two separate locations. Various telemetry, radar, electro-optical stations and down range ships positioned along the eastern coast tracked and monitored the missile trajectory and parameters. The missile followed text book trajectory meeting all mission objectives with high level of accuracy.

Second Test 
On 18 December 2021, DRDO successfully tested the ‘Agni P’ from Dr APJ Abdul Kalam island off the coast of Odisha. This second flight-test has proven the reliable performance of all the advanced technologies integrated into the system.

Third Test 
On 21 October 2022, Agni-P was successfully test fired for the third time to achieve maximum range. This marks the end of development stage. Strategic Forces Command (SFC) is now getting ready to conduct user trials before induction and mass production.

Reactions to testing

Domestic 
Indian defence experts view it as part of work in progress towards an advance anti-ship ballistic missile (ASBM) development for enhancing future sea denial capability against Chinese carrier battle groups in the Indian Ocean Region (IOR). Till September 2022, DRDO had completed design work of another  land-based  range missile to attack targets across Line of Actual Control with an anti ship variant against aircraft carriers to cover Indian carriers in Bay of Bengal and Arabian Sea.

International 
 – As per former People's Liberation Army (PLA) instructor Song Zhongping, Agni-P will need more testing to prove its anti-ship role like that of DF-21D or DF-26B which had already proven their capabilities in 2020 military exercise by destroying a target at South China Sea. But at present Agni-P does increase the accuracy, quick reaction time and precision strike capability of the Indian Armed Forces against tactical targets in China and Pakistan.
 – As per Frank Stanton Professor Vipin Narang of Nuclear Security and Political Science at Massachusetts Institute of Technology (MIT) who is also a scholar at Carnegie Endowment for International Peace (CEIP) Nuclear Policy Program, Agni-P is a weapon of counterforce doctrine as far as India's nuclear strategy is concerned due to recent debates over no first use (NFU) policy since 2016 under defence minister Manohar Parrikar.

See also

Agni-I
Agni
List of missiles

References

External links 
DRDO successfully tests new generation nuclear capable missile Agni-P-The Hindu
P: India successfully test-fires Agni series' new generation nuclear missile-India Today
Latest Agni-P Ballistic Missile Sparks A Fierce Debate Between Chinese & Indian Experts
PIB India
Agni Prime is the new missile in India’s nuclear arsenal. This is why its special -The Print

Ballistic missiles of India
Intermediate-range ballistic missiles
Nuclear missiles of India